IGS Energy, also known as Interstate Gas Supply, Inc., is an independent retail natural gas and electric supplier based in Dublin, Ohio, United States. It serves more than 1,000,000 residential, commercial and industrial customers in the states of Ohio, Michigan, Kentucky, New York, Pennsylvania, Indiana, Virginia, Maryland, Texas, California and Illinois. The company was founded in 1989, and today employs more than 900 people across 18 states.

History
In 1986, Marvin White, former CEO of Columbia Gas Distribution Companies, helped found Ohio's choice program. Three years later, in 1989, he founded Interstate Gas Supply, Inc. (IGS Energy), in Dublin, Ohio, with his son, Scott. The privately held company began as a commercial and industrial wholesale supplier of Ohio-produced natural gas. By 1992, IGS Energy expanded its focus to include natural gas retail marketing directly to end-users. IGS Energy has an A+ rating with the BBB.

Following the deregulation of residential natural gas service in 1997, IGS Energy began serving residential customers of Columbia Gas of Ohio. IGS Energy further expanded into the residential and small commercial arenas in 1999. Today, as a natural gas provider, the company offers gas in Ohio, Michigan, Kentucky, New York, California, Pennsylvania, Indiana, Virginia and Illinois and has plans to expand further.  In 2011, IGS acquired gas and electricity supplier Accent Energy, based in Dublin, Ohio, and its subsidiary Dynowatt.  At the same year IGS Energy began providing electric service to customers in Chicago and Pennsylvania.

In 2010, IGS moved into its current headquarters in Dublin, Ohio. The IGS Energy building was awarded LEED® Platinum certification, the highest of the four LEED certification ratings, the first commercial office building in central Ohio to meet the LEED® Platinum standard.

IGS continues to explore ways to bring energy to consumers in environmentally responsible ways. This includes offering green energy products, expanding solar energy offerings, compressed natural gas filling stations and distributed generation.

In July 2022, IGS acquired Dominion Energy Solutions.

Natural Gas and Electric Residential Choice Programs

IGS Energy participates in Natural Gas Choice and provides electric service to residential customers. In February 2012 IGS Energy began serving electric customers in Ohio.

CNG stations
In January 2013, IGS Energy CNG Services announced plans to invest $10 million to construct four compressed natural gas refueling stations off Interstate 79 in West Virginia and Pennsylvania. Construction of the I-79 CNG corridor was scheduled for completion by the end of 2013.  In June 2013 IGS Energy announced plans to construct another CNG station in Youngstown, Ohio.

IGS owns, operates or maintains 20 CNG stations across Ohio, Indiana, West Virginia, Pennsylvania and Wisconsin.

IGS Solar
In 2015, IGS began offering solar services for businesses, communities and residential homes under the IGS Solar brand.

IGS Lighting Solutions
In 2018, IGS began offering LED lighting to commercial customers.

Green Energy
In 2020, IGS Energy began offering "100% green electricity" and carbon-neutral Natural Gas to all new residential customers.

References

External links 
IGS Energy About Us
IGS Energy Columbus Business Journal
IGS Energy Better Business Bureau Review
Yelp Reviews - IGS Energy - Dublin, OH

Natural gas companies of the United States
Companies based in Dublin, Ohio
Companies based in the Columbus, Ohio metropolitan area
1989 establishments in Ohio
Companies established in 1989